Pimelea virgata is a species of small shrub, of the family Thymelaeaceae.  It is native to Australia.

Description
The species has an erect habit and grows 1 to 2 ft tall, with leaves 0.5 to 1 in long.  It grows flowers in heads, with 8 to 10 in each head.

References

virgata
Malvales of Australia